Allisson Ricardo Faramílio (born January 30, 1988) is a Brazilian striker who currently plays for FC Golden State Force in the Premier Development League.

References

External links

Soccer Sport Network

1988 births
Living people
Footballers from São Paulo (state)
Brazilian footballers
Brazilian expatriate sportspeople in Japan
Brazilian expatriate footballers
Sport Club Corinthians Paulista players
Sociedade Esportiva do Gama players
Esporte Clube Juventude players
Club Athletico Paranaense players
Oeste Futebol Clube players
Grêmio Osasco Audax Esporte Clube players
Red Bull Brasil players
Esporte Clube São Bento players
J2 League players
Matsumoto Yamaga FC players
Korea National League players
Kategoria Superiore players
Expatriate footballers in Albania
Brazilian expatriate sportspeople in Albania
FK Kukësi players
Expatriate footballers in Japan
Association football forwards